Ankhesenpepi IV was an ancient Egyptian queen, a wife of Pharaoh Pepi II of the Sixth Dynasty. She was the mother of a crown prince Neferkare. Pepi II also had several other wives.

Titles 
Her titles were: King’s Mother of Ankh-djed-Neferkare (mwt-niswt-‘nkh-djd-nfr-k3-r’), Mother of the Dual King (mwt-niswt-biti), King’s Wife of Men-ankh-Neferkare (ḥmt-niswt-mn-‘nḫ-nfr-k3-r’), King’s Wife, his beloved (ḥmt-niswt mryt.f), This God’s Daughter (z3t-nṯr-tw), Foster Child of Wadjet (sḏtit-w3ḏt).

Tomb 
Ankhesenpepi IV was buried in Saqqara. Apparently they lacked the appropriate resources for a burial, since she did not have a pyramid built for her. Her sarcophagus, which was made of reused stone, was found in a storeroom belonging to the mortuary temple of Queen Iput II.

References

23rd-century BC women
22nd-century BC women
Queens consort of the Sixth Dynasty of Egypt
Pepi II Neferkare